David Ejoke (born 8 November 1939) is a Nigerian sprinter. He competed in the 200 metres at the 1964 Summer Olympics and the 1968 Summer Olympics. He won a bronze medal in the 220 yards at the 1966 British Empire and Commonwealth Games. Ejoke also won a silver medal in the 200 metres at the 1965 All-Africa Games.

References

1939 births
Living people
Athletes (track and field) at the 1964 Summer Olympics
Athletes (track and field) at the 1968 Summer Olympics
Nigerian male sprinters
Olympic athletes of Nigeria
Athletes (track and field) at the 1966 British Empire and Commonwealth Games
Commonwealth Games bronze medallists for Nigeria
Commonwealth Games medallists in athletics
African Games bronze medalists for Nigeria
African Games silver medalists for Nigeria
African Games medalists in athletics (track and field)
Place of birth missing (living people)
Athletes (track and field) at the 1965 All-Africa Games
20th-century Nigerian people
Medallists at the 1966 British Empire and Commonwealth Games